Transilvania University of Brașov (UNITBV, also stylised UniTBv) is a higher education and research institution in Brașov, Romania which comprises 18 faculties, with a number of over 19,500 students and over 730 teaching staff members. Currently, Transilvania University of Brașov is the largest university in the centre of the country, a university that offers programmes in fields such as: mechanical engineering, industrial engineering, computers, construction, forestry, wood engineering, product design, nutrition and tourism, computer science, mathematics, economics, medicine, pedagogy, music, literature and linguistics, law, sociology and social work, psychology. There are 100 undergraduate programmes in the University: 83 full-time study programmes, 6 part-time study programmes and 11 distance learning programmes, 74 master's degree study programmes (70 full-time and 4 part-time) and 18 doctoral fields (full-time and part-time).

History

The foundations of higher education in Brașov were laid in 1948, when the Institute of Silviculture was founded. In 1949, the Institute of Mechanics was established, and in 1953, the Institute of Silviculture became the Forestry Institute. The two institutes fused into the Polytechnic Institute of Brașov. In 1959 the Department of Wood Industry and in 1964 the Manufacturing Technologies Department were founded within the Polytechnic Institute. In 1960, the Pedagogic Institute (Mathematics, Physics-Chemistry, Biology) came into being in Brașov, followed by the Department of Music in 1969. In 1964, the Department of Manufacturing Technologies was founded within the Polytechnic Institute. In 1971, the Polytechnic Institute and the Pedagogic Institute merged to create the University of Braşov. The University’s structure as approved by a Council of Ministers Decision of October 15, 1971 comprised eight faculties: Faculty of Mechanical Engineering, Faculty of Manufacturing Engineering, Faculty of Forestry, Faculty of Wood Industry, Faculty of Mathematics and Computer Science, Faculty of Physics–Chemistry, Faculty of Natural and Agricultural Sciences, and the Faculty of Music. In 1991, the University was renamed as Transilvania University of Brașov, at the University Senate’s request and according to the Government Decision of January 4, 1991 and the Order of the Ministry of Education and Science of March 22, 1991.  

The academic year 1990–1991 marked the establishment of several other faculties: Faculty of Electrical Engineering, Faculty of Music, Faculty of Sciences, and Faculty of Economic Sciences, and a few other educational units were set up the following year: the Faculty of Medicine and two academic colleges, one of Forestry and another of Economics and Computer Science.

In 1995, the Department of Psychology – Pedagogy – Teaching Methodology, on the structure of which the University Pedagogical Seminar was established, became the Department of Teaching Staff Training, and the Faculty of Machine Building Technology was divided into: The Faculty of Technological Engineering and the Faculty of Materials Science and Engineering.

In 1998, the “Local contact point in the field of Distance Learning”, within the network of Distance Learning Study Centres and created through the PHARE programme, became the Department for Distance Learning, which in 2005 changed its name to the Centre for Distance Learning and Part-time Studies.

In 2001, the Faculty of Electrical Engineering expanded its array of specializations, thus having its name changed to the Faculty of Electrical Engineering and Computer Science.

In 2002, the Faculty of Law and Sociology emerged from the Faculty of Economics, and the Faculty of Sciences divided into three faculties: The Faculty of Mathematics-Informatics, the Faculty of Letters and the Faculty of Sports and Physical Education. The Pedagogical and Philological University College and the Medical University College were established in the same year.

In 2003, the Faculty of Civil Engineering was created from the Faculty of Silviculture, and the Faculty of Mechanicsbecame the Faculty of Mechanical Engineering.

In 2004, the already existing Department of Psychology - Pedagogy – Teaching Methodology was established as an autonomous structure, namely the Faculty of Psychology and Educational Sciences.

In 2010, the Faculty of Law and Sociology was redefined by two new structures, the Faculty of Law and the Faculty of Sociology and Communication, the latter setting up a new undergraduate programme in 2017, Digital Media.

Starting with the academic year 2005-2006, the didactic activity is organized by study cycles: undergraduate studies, master's studies and doctoral studies. New curricula and new syllabi were designed, modern teaching, learning and assessment methods were introduced, which took account of the acquisition of knowledge and the creation of skills required of graduates on the labour market.

The institution has been managed since its foundation by:

Faculties 
The University’s 18 faculties offer undergraduate, master’s and doctoral degree study programmes, as well as distance learning, full-time and part-time study programmes.

International Academic Cooperation 
One of the strategic objective of this university, as is mentioned in their Strategic plan, is the internationalization achieved through: international affiliation, partnerships with higher education and scientific research institutions around the world, ensuring the framework for student and teacher mobility, participation in international education and research projects, conducting joint or double-degree study programmes in partnership with universities abroad.

Currently, Transilvania University of Brașov has concluded partnership agreements with over 500 institutions from more than 80 countries on all continents. Also, seeking to intensify this process, the University invests part of its own funds to support a series of programmes such as: Transilvania Academica Scholarship – a scholarship granted to international students, Transilvania Fellowship for Young Researchers, Transilvania Fellowship for Visiting Professors, Romanian Diaspora at Transilvania University, Rector’s Guests at Transilvania University (by which remarkable specialists from abroad are invited to the University, Artist in residence @ Tranilvania University.

Ranking
UNITBV occupies honorary positions in the University Metarank as well, having been enlisted in the international visibility ranking of Romanian universities ever since its first edition, published in 2016. In the 2017 edition, it occupies the 5th position in Metaranking.

An international ranking that evaluates higher education institutions according to how they align with the sustainable development objectives established by ONU, Impact Rankings 2020, made public by Times Higher Education – World University Rankings, includes 766 universities from 85 countries. UNITBV is ranked within the range 301–400 and third out of seven Romanian universities which are listed in this ranking.

Research and Development Institute
Transilvania University of Brașov is the only university in Romania that has built its own multidisciplinary research institute. At the time of completion, in 2013, the University’s Research and Development Institute was the largest investment in research infrastructure that a Romanian university made attracting European funds.

The Research-Development Institute of Transilvania University of Brașov (ICDT) was established through a structural funds project intended primarily to facilitate the increase of the University’s competitiveness in national and international research. In addition, the development of the Institute also aimed at anchoring the University in the business environment of the region, through technology transfer and the development of applied research, in close connection with local and regional needs for research-development-innovation.

The scientific research at the University has been structured on 30 priority, interdisciplinary fields that enable its successful integration in the European Research Area. The 30 research centres are:

 Renewable Energy Systems and Recycling
 High-Tech Products for the Automotive Industry
 Numerical Simulation, Testing and Mechanics of Composite Materials
 Sustainable Forestry and Wildlife Management
 Forest Engineering, Forest Management and Terrestrial Measurements
 Advanced Mechatronic Systems
 Advanced Manufacturing Technologies and Systems
 Economic Engineering and Production Systems
 Eco-Biotechnologies and Equipment in Food and Agriculture
 Advanced Electrical Systems
 Advanced Metal, Ceramics and MMC-Composite Materials and Technologies
 Process Control Systems
 Industrial Informatics and Robotics
 Furniture Eco-Design, Restoration and Certification in the Wood Industry
 Advanced Welding Eco-Technologies
 Embedded Systems and Advanced Communications
 Innovative Technologies and Advanced Products in the Wood Industry  
 Mathematical Modelling and Software Products
 Economic Research
 Fundamental Research and Prevention Strategies in Medicine
 Applied Medicine and Interventional Strategies in Medical Practice
 Cultural Innovation and Creativity
 Theoretical and Applied Linguistics
 Life Quality and Human Performance
 Design of Mechanical Elements and Systems
 Communication and Social Innovation
 Personal, Professional and Institutional Development and Education for a Sustainable Community
 Centre for Law Studies "Emil Poenaru" 
 The Science of Music – Excellence in Music Performance
 Civil Engineering Design Centre of the PRO-DD Institute

Other structures

University Library 

Publications fund:

     - 567,335 books;

     - 130,278 journals;

     - 22,036 descriptions of inventions;

     - 49,043 volumes of special collections.

The Multicultural Centre

The Music Centre 
The Music Centre was founded in 2015 to organize artistic events with famous Romanian and international musicians and to promote gifted students and young graduates of the Faculty of Music at Transilvania University of Brașov or other faculties of music in the country. The events take place at the University’s Sergiu T. Chiriacescu Aula and offer concerts and recitals included in the Concert Season, the Brassovia Chamber Music Student Festival and the Opera Gala. The virtue of the musical performances is supported by the Steinway & Sons concert piano, the most modern digital organ in the country and the Neupert harpsichord “Blanchet”.

The opening of the academic year 2019-2020 marked the opening of a new concert season of the Music Centre and the debut of the Chamber Orchestra of Transilvania University of Brașov (TUCO) with a concert conducted by maestro Traian Ichim. The newly established chamber orchestra has as Honorary President Prof. Dr. Eng. Ioan Vasile Abrudan, Rector of Transilvania University of Brașov.

Confucius Institute 
The Confucius Institute at Transilvania University of  Brașov was established in 2012, being created in partnership with Jianzhu University in Shenyang, China and operating under a cooperation agreement between Transilvania University in Brașov and Hanban – the Headquarters of the Confucius Institutes in Beijing. It is a non-profit organization that aims to teach and promote Chinese language learning, understanding Chinese culture and civilization, and to undertake cultural, educational and scientific exchanges with contemporary China.

Norbert Detaeye Media Centre

The Centre for Modern Languages   
The Centre for Modern Languages at Transilvania University of Brașov is one of the interfaces of the University with the community to which it is addressed, while being also involved in research and training activities in collaboration with other departments of the University.

Student life 
Transilvania University of Brașov provides 13 dormitories for student housing, with a total of 4,234 beds. The dormitories are distributed across two campuses, namely Colina Campus and Memorandului Campus. UNITBV also has two cafeterias, one in each campus, which serve 1,000 students daily.

Within the Colina Campus complex is also Colina Arena, an outdoor soccer field covered with artificial turf where the students compete in the traditional soccer event Colina League Cup every autumn. Close to Colina Arena are four other indoor gyms for students, two of which are multipurpose ones, one is used for gymnastics, and another for fitness.

The students at Transilvania University of Brașov take part in various scientific, cultural, sports, and administrative activities every year. They also participate in internal project competitions which are financed by the University and aim at providing solutions for the continuous improvement of student life on the University Campus.

Every year, the students of the BlueStreamline team represent Transilvania University at international level, in the formula-style races organized within the Formula Student competition.

Notable alumni
 Andreea Acatrinei – bronze, with the Romanian gymnastics team at the Beijing 2008 Olympic Games 
Marcian Cristea – university professor, Ruskin University England, Great Britain
Rareș Dumitrescu –silver with the Romanian sword team at the London 2012 Olympic Games
Felix Golbac – School Inspector, Bucharest
Iosif  Grămadă – Principal of the “Tudor Ciortea” High School, Brașov
Victor Hănescu – 26th in tennis ATP 2009
Alexandru Herlea – Professor Emeritus, Belfort-Montbeliard University of Technology, France 
Felicia Ionescu – Senior Economist, Federal Reserve System, USA 
Florin Ioraș – Professor, Buckinghamshire New University, Great Britain 
Ray Iunius – Director of Business Development, École hôtelière de Lausanne, Switzerland 
Monica Jiman – Chief Customer Success Officer Pentalog Europe & Asia 
Liviu Mircea Mateș – Director of the Brașov Philharmonic Orchestra 
Marius Modiga – music teacher, member of the vocal ensemble Anatoli 
Paula Rădulescu Ungureanu – bronze medal at the 2010 European Handball Championship 
Iulian Rusu – Artistic Director of the Brașov Philharmonic Orchestra 
Martha Eva Salcudean: Holocaust survivor, Professor Emerita at the University of British Columbia, Canada's first female head of a university engineering department – she got her first PhD (Mech. Eng.) at the Institute of Polytechnics, Brașov, 1969 
Raluca Strămăturaru and Valentin Crețu – multiple national sled champions, participants in three editions of the Winter Olympic Games 
Gabriel Tamaș – 63 selections and three goals for the representative football team of Romania 
Eva Tofalvi – gold at the 2008-2009 World Biathlon Championship, participant in six editions of the Winter Olympic Games 
Ciprian Țuțu – Conductor of the Radio Choir, Bucharest 
Delia Vișan – director of international projects, Paris Dauphine University, France

Members of the academic community involved in the political and administrative life 

 Ștefan Vasile Beres – Deputy in the Romanian Parliament (2008 - 2012)
  – Senator in the Romanian Parliament (1990 - 1996); President of the Brașov County Council (2000 - 2016)
  – the first mayor (prefect) of Brașov County after the Romanian Revolution (January - February 1990); member of the County Council and of the Permanent Delegation of the Brașov County Council (1990 - 1996); Senator in the Romanian Parliament (1996 - 2000); Local Councillor of Brașov municipality
  – Deputy in the Romanian Parliament (2012 - 2016) and Senator in the Romanian Parliament (2016 – present)
 Ivan Cismaru – Senator in the Romanian Parliament (2004 - 2008), Vice President of the Senate (April - September 2008)
  – Senator in the Romanian Parliament (2016 - 2020), Mayor of Brașov (2020–present)
 Ion Diniță – Member of the Romanian Parliament (2012 - 2015)
 Florea Dudiță – Senator in the Romanian Parliament (1992 -1996) and Ambassador of Romania in the Federal Republic of Germany (1995 - 1997)
 Ion Dumitru – Deputy in the Romanian Parliament (2004 - 2012)
 Marius-Alexandru Dunca – Senator in the Romanian Parliament (2016–present); Minister of Youth and Sports (January 4, 2017 - January 26, 2018)
 Gheorghe Flutur – Senator in the Romanian Parliament (2000 - 2004), (2004 - 2008) and (2012 - 2016); President of Suceava County Council, Minister of Agriculture, Forests and Rural Development (December 2004 - October 2006).
 Filip Georgescu – Deputy in the Romanian Parliament (1990 -1992) and (2000 - 2012)
 Tinel Gheorghe – Deputy in the Romanian Parliament (2008–present)
 Ioan Ghișe – Senator in the Romanian Parliament (2008 - 2016); Deputy in the Romanian Parliament (1992 - 1996) and (2004 - 2008) and Mayor of Brașov (1996 - 2004)
 Alexandru Ion Herlea – Minister of European Integration (December 11, 1996 - December 22, 1999); Ambassador, Head of the Romanian Mission to the EU (2000 - 2001)
 Pavel Horj – Deputy in the Romanian Parliament (2008 - 2012)
 Gheorghe Ialomițeanu – Deputy in the Romanian Parliament (2008 - 2016); Minister of Finance (September 3, 2010 – February 9, 2012)
 Liviu Laza - Matiuța – Deputy in the Romanian Parliament (2012 - 2016)
 Gheorghe Marin – Deputy in the Romanian Parliament (1997 - 2004) and (2012 - 2016); Senator in the Romanian Parliament (2016–present)
 Ovidius Mărcuțianu – Senator in the Romanian Parliament (2008 - 2012)
 Leonard Orban – European Commissioner for Multilingualism (January 2007 - February 2010), Minister of European Affairs (2011 - 2012) and Presidential Adviser (March 2010 - September 2011) and (January 2015 – present); decorated with the Order “Star of Romania” in the rank of Knight, for his contribution to Romania’s accession to NATO, in 2002 [35]
 Ludovic Orban – Prime Minister of Romania (November 4, 2019 – present) and Minister of Transport (April 2007 - December 2008); president of the National Liberal Party of Romania (since June 2017); Deputy in the Romanian Parliament (2008 - 2016)
 Gheorghe Secară – Senator in the Romanian Parliament (1992 - 1996); Deputy in the Romanian Parliament and Vice-Chairman of the Education Commission (1996 - 2000)
 Ovidiu Ioan Silaghi – Vice-President of the Committee on Budgetary Control of the European Parliament (January 31,  2007 – April 2, 2007); European Parliament (January 1, 2007 – April 2, 2007) and (September 4, 2013 – June 10, 2014); Deputy in the Romanian Parliament (2000 - 2004) and (2012 - 2013); Minister of Transport (May 7, 2012 - December 21, 2012); Minister for Small and Medium-sized Enterprises, Trade, Tourism and the Liberal Professions (April 5, 2007 – December 22, 2008)
 Mihai Stepanescu – Mayor of Resita (2008 - 2015)
 Emil Stoica – Deputy in the Romanian Parliament (1990 - 1992) and (1992 - 1996)
 Mihai Sturzu – Deputy in the Romanian Parliament (2012 - 2016)
 Lucian Șova – Deputy in the Romanian Parliament (2012 - 2020); Minister of Communications and Information Society (June 29, 2017 - January 29, 2018); Minister of Transport and Infrastructure (January 29, 2018 - February 22, 2019)
 Ion Tabugan – Deputy in the Romanian Parliament (2008–present)
 Romică Tomescu – Minister of Waters, Forests and Environmental Protection (April 17, 1998 - December 28, 2000)

References

External links
Official Website 

Transilvania University of Brașov
Medical schools in Romania
Forestry education
Forestry in Romania
Buildings and structures in Brașov
Education in Brașov
1948 establishments in Romania
1971 establishments in Romania